Jonatan Giráldez Costas (born 27 November 1991) is a Spanish football coach who is the current manager of FC Barcelona Femení; having joined the team as an assistant coach, he was promoted in July 2021. Though from Galicia, he has spent his entire career, including work in sports analytics, in Catalonia.

Early years 
Jonatan Giráldez Costas was born on 27 November 1991 in Vigo, Galicia, Spain. Growing up, he played football with local clubs Sárdoma, Coruxo and Areosa, but even when young decided he would be better coaching. In 2012, he moved to Barcelona to study sports instruction.

Career 
Giráldez' first roles were in coaching and sports analytics for RCD Espanyol Cantera and the youth sections of the Catalonia women's national football team. He then became the head coach of the under-12 Catalonia national football team, his first managerial role. In 2019, he joined the coaching staff of Lluís Cortés at FC Barcelona Femení, following Fran Sánchez' dismissal. Spending three years as a technical assistant, Giráldez held an increasingly important role in training and game strategy; the team reached the UEFA Women's Champions League finals, and won most domestic titles in this era. The 2020–21 season, in which they won the continental treble, is considered one of the best in history. At the end of this season, Cortés left the position as manager, and two days later Giráldez was formally announced to be taking over, initially on a one-year contract. His first match in charge of the club, a pre-season friendly, saw Barcelona defeat Elche 17–0.

References 

1991 births
Living people
Spanish football managers
FC Barcelona Femení managers
Primera División (women) managers